Ladies’ Night is a 2003 Mexican film directed by Gabriela Tagliavini. The film is a romantic comedy about two girls who find love in modern-day Mexico City.

Plot 
Alicia (Ana Claudia Talancón) is an apparently conservative girl that is about to marry, but her life takes an unexpected route when in the party before the wedding, she meets a stripper (Luis Roberto Guzmán) hired by Ana (Ana de la Reguera), a jealous friend of Alicia's boyfriend, to upset her on this very special day.

Surprising everyone (her conservative family, her own boyfriend and even Ana herself), Alicia still decides to follow the guy. The rivalry among Ana and Alicia is thus transformed into a strong friendship, and they both show themselves as very independent women.

Cast
Ana de la Reguera as Ana
Ana Claudia Talancón as Alica
Luis Roberto Guzmán as Roco
Fabián Corres as Fabián (Alicia's boyfriend)

External links

Notes 

Mexican romantic comedy films
2003 films
2000s Spanish-language films
Films distributed by Disney
2000s Mexican films